Produced by Texas Instruments, the Magic Wand Reader (introduced in 1982 as the Magic Wand Speaking Reader) had a hand held "wand" that one would slide over the "Talking Tracks" to read along with educational books.

Bill Cosby was initially a spokesman for this device.

The Magic Wand Speaking Library

Skill Levels
Different levels of activities  and short stories were available.

Level 1  Toddler.
Level 2  Preschool.
Level 3  Early Elementary.

Series
Green - Early Readers
Cyan - Letters, Numbers, Words *(Basics)
Blue - Favorite Characters and Famous Faces *(Sprites' Adventures)
Purple - Information
Orange - Fun and Laughter
Yellow - Classics, Folk Tales and Legends
Brown - Magical Adventures *(Magic Creatures)

The series were listed slightly different on the back of the pack in book Mac's Big Surprise

Books
 Mac's Big Surprise (Pack-in book)

References

Texas Instruments hardware
Products introduced in 1982